Sayin may refer to 

 Sayin', eye dialect for "saying"
 Sayin, a god worshipped in pre-Islamic Arabia
 Sayin Khan, a Turkmen confederation
 Sayın, a Turkish last name